Sir Philip Albert Muntz, 1st Baronet (5 January 1839 – 21 December 1908) was an English businessman and politician who sat in the House of Commons from 1884 to 1906.

Muntz was the son of George Frederic Muntz of Umberslade Hall, Warwickshire and his wife Eliza Price. He was a J.P. for Warwickshire. In 1881 he built Dunsmore House, a three-storey Grade II listed country house near Rugby.

In 1884, Muntz was elected as a Conservative Member of Parliament (MP) for Warwickshire North but the constituency was abolished under the Redistribution of Seats Act 1885. He was elected as MP for Tamworth at the 1885 general election, and held the seat until his death in 1908 aged 69.

It was announced that he would receive a baronetcy in the 1902 Coronation Honours list published on 26 June 1902 for the (subsequently postponed) coronation of King Edward VII, and on 24 July 1902 he was created a Baronet, of Dunmore, near Rugby, in the parish of Clifton-on-Dunmore, in the county of Warwick.

Muntz married his cousin Rosalie Muntz, daughter of Philip Henry Muntz in 1859.

References

External links 

1839 births
1908 deaths
Conservative Party (UK) MPs for English constituencies
Baronets in the Baronetage of the United Kingdom
UK MPs 1880–1885
UK MPs 1885–1886
UK MPs 1886–1892
UK MPs 1892–1895
UK MPs 1895–1900
UK MPs 1900–1906
UK MPs 1906–1910